Upper–Mill Street Historic District is a national historic district located at Poughkeepsie, Dutchess County, New York.  It includes 25 contributing buildings built during the mid- to late-19th century.  They include a variety of brick and frame buildings, originally residential, that have been converted to office and other commercial use. They are representative of vernacular mill workers' dwellings and fashionable factory owners' residences.  The district also includes two churches.

It was added to the National Register of Historic Places in 1982.

References

Historic districts on the National Register of Historic Places in New York (state)
Houses in Poughkeepsie, New York
National Register of Historic Places in Poughkeepsie, New York